Patrick Nelis (5 October 1898–1970) was an Irish footballer who played in the Football League for Accrington Stanley, Nottingham Forest and Wigan Borough.

References

1898 births
1970 deaths
Association football forwards
English Football League players
Accrington Stanley F.C. (1891) players
Nottingham Forest F.C. players
Wigan Borough F.C. players
Coleraine F.C. players
Derry City F.C. players
Pre-1950 IFA international footballers
Association footballers from Northern Ireland